Babuganj is an administrative unit of Barisal District in the Division of Barisal, Bangladesh.

Geography
It has a total area of 164.88 km2.

Demographics

According to the 2011 Bangladesh census, Babuganj Upazila had 31,663 households and a population of 140,361, 7.0% of whom lived in urban areas. 9.1% of the population was under the age of 5. The literacy rate (age 7 and over) was 68.8%, compared to the national average of 51.8%.

Points of interest
Durgasagar

Durgasagar, with an area of about 2,500 hectare, is the largest pond or dighi of southern Bangladesh. It is located at Madhabpasa village of Babuganj upazila, about 11 km away from Barisal town. Locally it is known as Madhabpasha Dighi. According to a desire of Rani Durgavati, mother of Raja Joynarayan, the dighi was dug in 1780 (1187 BS).

Educational institutions
The faculty of animal science and veterinary medicine of Patuakhali Science and Technology University is situated at Khanpura, Babuganj.

Administration
Babuganj Upazila is divided into six union parishads: Chandpasha, Dehergati, Jahangir Nagar, Kedarpur, Madhabpasha, and Rahmatpur. The union parishads are subdivided into 81 mauzas and 90 villages.

Maps

Official Babugonj Upzilla Map

Notable people
Kirtinarayan Basu, 17th-century Raja of Chandradwip who converted to Islam
Abdul Wahab Khan, 3rd Speaker of the National Assembly of Pakistan
Sal Khan, founder of Khan Academy

References

Upazilas of Barisal District